Laxman Munda is an Indian politician, belonging to the Communist Party of India (Marxist). He was elected as MLA from the Bonai (ST) assembly constituency of the Sundargarh district in the 2004, 2014 and 2019 elections.

References

Communist Party of India (Marxist) politicians from Odisha
Living people
Year of birth missing (living people)
Place of birth missing (living people)
Odisha MLAs 2019–2024